The 2017 PBA D-League Aspirants Cup is the first conference of the 2017 PBA Developmental League season. The tournament opened on January 19, 2017 at the Ynares Sports Arena, Pasig.

There are 10 teams in this season's Aspirant's Cup, 4 are holdovers from last year's Foundation Cup, 2 returnees after a short hiatus, and 3 new squads. 5 of the teams were represented by players from various colleges and universities.

Draft
The annual draft of the PBA D-League will be conducted on December 20, 2016. 128 aspirants—113 local players and 15 Filipino-foreigners—had already submitted their intention to participate in the draft. AMA, Tanduay, Racal, Caféfrance and Wang's will picked the first five draft picks, while a lottery will decide the draft orders of 4 new teams, San Beda-Cignal, JRU, MLQU and Batangas. As a guest team, Blustar Malaysia will be ineligible to join the drafting proceedings. Jeron Teng of the De La Salle Green Archers was picked as the #1 draft pick by AMA Online Education.

Draft Order1st Round:

 1. AMA Online Education: Jeron Teng (DLSU)
 2. Tanduay: Jom Sollano (Letran)
 3. Racal: Junjun Gabriel (CDSL)
 4. Cafefrance: Patrick Aquino (CEU)
 5. Wang's: G-Boy Babilonia (Ateneo)
 6. Victoria Sports-MLQU: Jayson Grimaldo (MLQU)
 7. Cignal-San Beda: Davon Potts (San Beda)
 8. Batangas: Wilmar Anderson (UB)
 9. JRU: PASS
 10. Blustar Malaysia: PASS

Tournament Format 
 Ten teams will play in a single round-robin elimination phase. 
 Only the top six teams will only make it to the playoffs after the elimination round.
 #1 & #2 seeds will head straight to the semifinals, where #3-#6 seeds will undergo in the quarterfinals.
 The Semifinals and the Championship will both be contested in a best-of-3 series.

Team Standings

Playoffs

Quarter-finals

Semi-finals

Finals

Awards

References

External links
Official website

Aspirant's Cup
2017